The Central Valley is a broad, elongated, flat valley that dominates the interior of California. The valley is bounded by the Coast Ranges to the west and the Sierra Nevada to the east.

The Central Valley is a region known for its agricultural productivity: it provides more than half of the fruits, vegetables, and nuts grown in the United States. The valley hosts many cities, including the state capital Sacramento, as well as Redding, Chico, Stockton, Modesto, Merced, Fresno, Visalia, and Bakersfield.

The Central Valley watershed comprises , or over a third of California. The Sacramento and San Joaquin river systems drain their respective valleys and meet to form the Sacramento–San Joaquin River Delta, a large expanse of interconnected canals, stream beds, sloughs, marshes and peat islands. The delta empties into the San Francisco Bay, and ultimately into the Pacific. The waters of the Tulare Basin essentially never reach the ocean (with the exception of Kings River waters diverted northward for irrigation), though they are connected by man-made canals to the San Joaquin.

The valley encompasses all or parts of 19 California counties: Butte, Colusa, Glenn, Fresno, Kern, Kings, Madera, Merced, Placer, San Joaquin, Sacramento, Shasta, Solano, Stanislaus, Sutter, Tehama, Tulare, Yolo and Yuba.

Name
Older names include "the Great Valley", a name still often seen in scientific references (notably Great Valley Sequence), as well as "Golden Empire", a booster name that is still referred to by some organizations (notably Golden Empire Transit, Golden Empire Council).

Population

Subregions and their counties commonly associated with the valley include:
 North Sacramento Valley (all or parts of Shasta, Tehama, Glenn, Butte and Colusa counties)
 Sacramento Metropolitan area (all or parts of Sacramento, El Dorado, Solano, Sutter, Yuba, Yolo and Placer counties)
 North San Joaquin (all or parts of San Joaquin, Stanislaus and Merced counties)
 South San Joaquin (all or parts of Madera, Fresno, Kings, Tulare and Kern counties)

The four main population centers in the Central Valley area are roughly equidistant from the next. From south to north, they are Bakersfield, Fresno, Sacramento and Redding. These four cities act as hubs for regional commerce and transportation.

Metropolitan areas
As of 2010, some 7.2 million people lived in the Central Valley; it was the fastest-growing region in California. It includes 12 Metropolitan Statistical Areas (MSA) and 1 Micropolitan Statistical Area (μSA). Below, they are listed by MSA and μSA population. The largest city is Fresno followed by the state capital Sacramento. The following metropolitan and micropolitan statistical areas are listed from largest to smallest:

Ethnography
After English and Spanish, Punjabi is the third most commonly spoken language in the Central Valley. The valley has the largest Sikh population in the nation.

Geography

The flatness of the valley floor contrasts with the rugged hills or gentle mountains that are typical of most of California's terrain. The valley is thought to have originated below sea level as an offshore area depressed by subduction of the Farallon Plate into a trench farther offshore. The valley has no earthquake faults of its own but is surrounded by faults to the east and west.

The valley was enclosed by the uplift of the Coast Ranges, with its original outlet into Monterey Bay. Faulting moved the Coast Ranges, and a new outlet developed near what is now San Francisco Bay. Over the millennia, the valley filled with the sediments of these same ranges, as well as the rising Sierra Nevada to the east; that filling eventually created an extraordinary flatness just barely above sea level. Before California's flood control and aqueduct system was built, annual snow melt turned much of the valley into an inland sea.

The one notable exception to the flat valley floor is Sutter Buttes, the remnants of an extinct volcano just to the northwest of Yuba City.

Another significant geologic feature of the Central Valley lies hidden beneath the delta. The Stockton Arch is an upwarping of the crust beneath the valley sediments that extends southwest to northeast across the valley.

The Central Valley lies within the California Trough physiographic section, which is part of the larger Pacific Border province, which in turn is part of the Pacific Mountain System.

Environment

The Central Valley was formerly a diverse expanse of grassland, containing areas of prairie, desert grassland (at the southern end), oak savanna, riparian forest, marsh, several types of seasonal vernal pools, and large lakes such as now-dry Tulare Lake (once the largest freshwater lake west of the Mississippi), Buena Vista Lake and Kern Lake. However, much of the Central Valley environment has been altered by human activity, including the introduction of exotic plants, notably grasses. The valley's grasslands, wetlands, and riparian forests constitute the California Central Valley grasslands, a temperate grasslands, savannas, and shrublands ecoregion. The foothill oak woodlands and chaparral that fringe the valley have been categorized as the California interior chaparral and woodlands ecoregion.

Flora

The dominant grass of the valley was Nassella pulchra mixed with other species, but today only 1% of the grassland in the valley is intact. Grassland flowers include California poppy (Eschscholzia californica), lupins, and purple owl's clover (Castilleja exserta), which can still be seen, especially in Antelope Valley in the Tehachapi Mountains. Riverside trees include willows, western sycamore (Platanus racemosa), box elder (Acer negundo), Fremont cottonwood (Populus fremontii), and the endemic valley oak (Quercus lobata).

Fauna

The Central Valley was once home to large populations of pronghorn antelope (Antilocapra americana), elk including the endemic tule elk subspecies (Cervus elaphus nannodes), mule deer (Odocoileus hemionus), California ground squirrels, gophers, mice, hare, rabbits and kangaroo rats, along with their predators including the San Joaquin kit fox (an endangered subspecies surviving on the San Joaquin Valley's hillsides). The valley's wetlands were an important habitat for wintering waterbirds and migrating birds of other kinds. Reptiles and amphibians of the valley include the endemic San Joaquin coachwhip snake (Masticophis flagellum ruddocki), blunt-nosed leopard lizard (Gambelia sila), Gilbert's skink (Eumeces gilberti) and the western aquatic garter snake (Thamnophis couchii). Endemic invertebrates are present. The Central Valley is home to endemic fish species, including the Sacramento Pikeminnow, Sacramento Perch, Sacramento Blackfish, and Sacramento Splittail.

Protected areas
The Great Valley Grasslands State Park preserves an example of the valley's native grass habitat, while oak savanna habitats survive near Visalia. Areas of wetland and riverside woodland are found in the north, especially by the Sacramento River system, including the Nature Conservancy's Cosumnes River Preserve just south of Sacramento, Gray Lodge Wildlife Area, Butte Sink Wildlife Management Area, and other patches in the delta area. Remaining vernal pools include Pixley National Wildlife Refuge between Tulare, California, and Bakersfield and Jepson Prairie Preserve in the delta. Large blocks of desert scrubland exist in the southern San Joaquin Valley and the Carrizo Plain, just outside the valley, but offering a similar landscape.

The wetlands have been the target of rescue operations to restore areas replaced by agriculture.

These patches of natural habitat are disconnected, which is particularly damaging for wildlife that is used to migrating along the rivers. Agriculture, grazing land, and the draining of lakes and rivers have radically altered valley habitats. Most of the grassland has been overtaken by new species; most vernal pools have been destroyed, leaving only those on the higher slopes; the marshland has been drained, and the riverbank woodlands have nearly all been affected.

Health
The valley gives its name to Valley fever, which is primarily a disease of the lungs that is common in the southwestern United States and northwestern Mexico. It is caused by the fungus Coccidioides immitis, which grows in soils in areas of low rainfall, high summer temperatures, and moderate winter temperatures. These fungal spores become airborne when the soil is disturbed by winds, construction, or farming. This illness frequently takes weeks or months to resolve. Occasionally Valley Fever is life-threatening or even fatal.

Due to the agricultural industry's significant presence in the Valley, pesticide drift and leaching have become concerns. Residents risk contamination when living in proximity to application sites.

Air pollution 

Air pollution is a growing problem that affects all of the citizens in the Central Valley. Some reasons of poor air pollution in the Central Valley are due to agriculture and its geographical features.

Since the Central Valley consists mostly of farming land, a wide, flat valley, the emissions from the soil that is used for growing produce are released into the air. The soil exudes nitrous oxide, an odorless and colorless gas that can be harmful when exposed to it for a long period of time, and incorporates itself into the ozone layer located at ground level. Production of nitrous oxide in California has shown that the addition of soil and fertilization can emit about 161,100 metric tons per year. Long term effects that nitrous oxide can have on a human being is loss of blood pressure, fainting, anemia, or lung cancer.

The physical geographical attributes can also contribute to the air pollution quality. The Central Valley is surrounded by mountain ranges which can capture the pollution coming from the agricultural farming, preventing it from dispersing from the other areas in California.

The Central Valley is also expanding in the number of people that coincide in that area, so it increases the number of cars which can also contribute to the amount of emission that is in the air.

Climate
The northern Central Valley has a hot Mediterranean climate (Köppen climate classification Csa); the more southerly parts in rainshadow zones are dry enough to be Mediterranean steppe (BShs, as around Fresno) or even low-latitude desert (BWh, as in areas around Bakersfield). It is very hot and dry during the summer and cool and damp in winter when frequent ground fog known regionally as "tule fog" can obscure vision. Summer daytime temperatures frequently surpass , and common heat waves might bring temperatures exceeding . Mid-autumn to mid-spring is the rainy season—although during the late summer, southeasterly winds can bring tropical thunderstorms, mainly in the southern half of the San Joaquin Valley but occasionally to the Sacramento Valley. The northern half of the Central Valley receives greater precipitation than the semidesert southern half. Frost occurs at times in the fall months, but snow is extremely rare.

Tule fog

Tule fog  is a thick ground fog that settles along the valley's length. Tule fog forms during the late fall and winter (California's rainy season), after the first significant rainfall. The official season is from November 1 to March 31. This phenomenon is named after the valley's tule grass wetlands (tulares). Auto collisions caused by the tule fog are the leading cause of weather-related casualties in California.

Statistics for selected cities

Hydrography

Two river systems drain and define the two parts of the Central Valley.

In the south part of the San Joaquin Valley, the alluvial fan of the Kings River and another from Coast Ranges streams have created a divide. The dry Tulare basin of the Central Valley receives flow from four major Sierra Nevada rivers, the Kings, Kaweah, Tule, and Kern. This basin, usually endorheic, formerly filled during snowmelt and spilled out into the San Joaquin River. Called Tulare Lake, it is usually dry because the rivers feeding it have been diverted for agricultural purposes.

Central Valley rivers converge in the Sacramento-San Joaquin Delta, a network of marshy channels, distributaries, and sloughs that wind around islands mainly used for agriculture. There the rivers merge with tidewater, and eventually reach the ocean after passing through Suisun Bay, San Pablo Bay, upper San Francisco Bay, and finally the Golden Gate. Many of the islands lie below sea level because of intensive agriculture, and face a high risk of flooding, which would allow salt water to rush back into the delta, especially when too little fresh water is flowing in from the Valley.

These figures vary widely from year to year. Over 25 million people, living in the valley and other regions of the state, rely on the water carried by these rivers.

Engineering
Sierra Nevada runoff provides one of California's largest water resources. The Sacramento River is the second largest river to empty into the Pacific from the contiguous United States, behind only the Columbia River and greater than the Colorado River. Combined with the fertile and expansive area of the Central Valley's floor, the Central Valley is ideal for agriculture.

The Central Valley is one of the United States' most productive growing regions. This is made possible by engineering the watercourses to prevent flooding during the spring snowmelt and drying up in the summer and autumn. Many dams, including Shasta Dam, Oroville Dam, Folsom Dam, New Melones Dam, Don Pedro Dam, Hetch Hetchy Dam, Friant Dam, Pine Flat Dam and Isabella Dam, were constructed on the rivers, with many of them being part of the Central Valley Project. These dams impact physical, economic, cultural, and ecological resources: for example, enabling the development of its vast agricultural resources but leading to the loss of the Chinook salmon.

Post-World War II demand for urban development, most notably the San Francisco Bay Area and the Los Angeles/Inland Empire/San Diego, required water resources. Moreover, agriculture in the southern Central Valley required far more water than was available locally. The Feather River in the Sacramento Valley was looked to as a water source, leading to the California State Water Project. This transports water to the southern San Joaquin Valley and urban areas south of the Tehachapi Mountains.

Runoff from the Sacramento and San Joaquin Rivers is intercepted in the delta through a series of pumps that divert water into the California Aqueduct, which runs south along the length of the San Joaquin Valley. In parallel, pumps divert water into the Delta–Mendota Canal. The flow of the Sacramento River is further supplemented by a tunnel from the Trinity River (a tributary of the Klamath River, northwest of the Sacramento Valley) near Redding. Cities of the San Francisco Bay Area, also needing water, built aqueducts from the Mokelumne River and Tuolumne River that run east to west across the middle part of the Central Valley.

Flooding

Most valley lowlands are prone to flooding, especially in the old Tulare Lake, Buena Vista Lake, and Kern Lake rivers. The Kings, Kaweah, Tule and Kern rivers originally flowed into these seasonal lakes, which would expand each spring to flood large parts of the southern San Joaquin Valley. Farms, towns, and infrastructure in these lakebeds are protected with levee systems, while the risk of floods damaging properties increased greatly.

The Great Flood of 1862 was the valley's worst flood in recorded history, flooding most of the valley and putting some places as much as 20 feet under water.

In 2003, it was determined that Sacramento had both the least protection against and nearly the highest risk of flooding. Congress then granted a $220 million loan for upgrades in Sacramento County. Other counties in the valley that often face flooding are Yuba, Stanislaus, and San Joaquin.

Rain 
California is a state that has experienced consistent on-and-off drought for many years. In 2012, there was a major drop in precipitation levels in the Central Valley which has caused an almost constant drought and low-level precipitation levels throughout the Northern California region. As of 2014, the highest levels of precipitation occur during December and January, and because of the climate of the Central Valley, rainfall is the most common form of precipitation.

Landslides 
There is a very strong positive correlation between rainfall and slow-moving landslides in Northern California, especially in the Central Valley region. Changes in climate and precipitation levels have shown that consistent average rainfall has increased the number and intensity of landslides within the past 5–6 years. This information was shown in a study that focused on the behavior of these slow-moving landslides and how their nature changed with years of extreme average rainfall versus minimal average rainfall. In 2016, the average annual precipitation levels were lower because of a drought that was coming to an end at that time. The minimal rainfall in that year showed that 119 landslides had been moving. Comparatively, in 2017, there were very extreme levels of precipitation in the Central Valley, which cause 312 landslides to move that year. Slow-moving landslides are impacted even if the intensity of the rainfall is not as severe.

Consistent, moderately intense rainfall increases the saturation of water in the ground. This over-saturation is what causes the movement of a slow-moving landslide, rather than the more quick-moving and rigorous landslides that also occur in this region of California. Quick-moving landslides are caused by very intense rain, or sometimes earthquakes, that make a greater difference in the land in a shorter amount of time. According to a survey paper written in 1988 about a storm that occurred in 1982 in the Central Valley region, rainstorms that can cause that type of landslide to happen about every 5 years. Landslides to higher degrees, such as the ones that happened due to the 1982 storm, only occur every 20 to 100+ years. This intense storm in the San Francisco Bay area caused a lot of damage as a result of moving debris and landslides. They caused damage to the land and put people living in these areas that are susceptible to these disasters in great harm. The aftermath of this storm involved millions of dollars in retributions to restore the land and surrounding areas. It also led people to make greater efforts into planning around the danger of these landslides, as in how to manipulate the land to accommodate the consequences.

Droughts 

Out of the past twenty-two years, California has experienced significant drought conditions for thirteen years. From 2000 to 2018 was the second driest period that California has ever experienced. The driest three-year period ever in California was from 2012 to 2014. Three-quarters of the state of California is experiencing extreme drought conditions. There are also multiple types of droughts such as agricultural droughts, meteorological droughts, snow droughts, and hydrological droughts. All of these droughts affect California in different ways. Droughts can damage forests and can cause wildfires. Droughts cause forests to become dry which causes trees to die. Dead trees result in wildfires. The U.S. drought monitor is released every Thursday, showing which parts of the U.S. are in a drought. It started in 2000, and since then the longest duration of a drought in California lasted a total of 376 weeks. It started on December 11, 2011, and ended on March 5, 2019. The most intense period captured on the drought monitor was on the week of July 29, 2014. It showed that 58.41% of California's land was affected by a drought. In 2014–2015, farm-related losses in California totaled $5 billion and 20,000 farmers also lost their jobs.

Economy
Agriculture is the primary industry in most of the Central Valley. A notable exception is the Sacramento area, which hosts a large and stable workforce of government employees. Despite state hiring cutbacks and the closure of several military bases, Sacramento's economy has continued to expand and diversify and now more closely resembles that of the San Francisco Bay Area. Primary sources of population growth are Bay Area migrants seeking lower housing costs, augmented by immigration from Asia, Central America, Mexico, Ukraine, and the rest of the former Soviet Union.

Agriculture
The Central Valley is one of the world's most productive agricultural regions. More than 230 crops are grown there. On less than 1 percent of the total farmland in the United States, the Central Valley produces 8 percent of the nation's agricultural output by value: US$43.5 billion in 2013. California's farms and ranches earned almost $50 billion in 2018. The valley's productivity relies on irrigation from surface water and badly depleted underground aquifers. About one-sixth of the US' irrigated land is in the Central Valley.

Virtually all non-tropical crops are grown in the Central Valley, which is the primary source for produce throughout the United States, including tomatoes, grapes, cotton, apricots, and asparagus.

The US' top four counties in agricultural sales are in the Central Valley (2007 Data).

Early farming was concentrated close to the Sacramento-San Joaquin Delta, where the water table was high year-round and water transport was readily available. Subsequent irrigation projects brought many more parts of the valley into productive use. The even larger California State Water Project was formed in the 1950s and construction continued over the following decades.

National Farmworkers Association (NFWA)

In the 1960s, farm labor leaders Cesar Chavez and Dolores Huerta organized Mexican American grape pickers into a union, the National Farmworkers Association (NFWA), to improve their working conditions. This organizing took place primarily in the Central Valley because of the extensive agriculture, especially in and around Delano.

Utilities

The state water project's Oroville Dam in the Sacramento Valley provides water and power for the California Aqueduct in the San Joaquin Valley. The aqueduct runs from Clifton Court Forebay in the Delta southwards across the Transverse Ranges. The Central Valley Project includes numerous facilities between Shasta Dam in the north and Bakersfield in the south. Pacific Gas and Electric, Western Area Power Administration, and Southern California Edison built an interconnected electric grid connecting the north and south ends of the Central Valley.

See also
 List of regions of California
 Central Valley groundwater pollution
 Lake Corcoran
 Orland Buttes

Notes

References

External links

 https://www.ncdc.noaa.gov/news/drought-monitoring-economic-environmental-and-social-impacts 
 https://yaleclimateconnections.org/2021/06/california-americas-garden-is-drying-out/
 Central Valley Tourism Association
 CA Central Valley & Foothills, project area of the American Land Conservancy
 Great Valley Center
 The Big Valley series

 
Valleys of California
Agriculture in California
Grasslands of California
Geologic provinces of California
Geography of California
Regions of California
Physiographic sections
Valleys of Butte County, California
Valleys of Colusa County, California
Valleys of Glenn County, California
Valleys of El Dorado County, California
Valleys of Fresno County, California
Valleys of Kern County, California
Valleys of Kings County, California
Valleys of Madera County, California
Valleys of Merced County, California
Valleys of Placer County, California
Valleys of San Joaquin County, California
Valleys of Sacramento County, California
Valleys of Shasta County, California
Valleys of Stanislaus County, California
Valleys of Sutter County, California
Valleys of Tehama County, California
Valleys of Tulare County, California
Valleys of Yuba County, California
Valleys of Yolo County, California
Almond production